Everything Sad Is Untrue: (A True Story) is a young adult/middle grade autobiographical novel by Daniel Nayeri, published August 25, 2020 by Levine Querido. In 2021, the book won the Michael L. Printz Award, Judy Lopez Memorial Award for Children's Literature, and Middle East Book Award for Youth Literature.

Background 
Nayeri has stated that Everything Sad Is Untrue is "entirely biographical" and that "the first version ... was a nonfiction essay for adults." Because "[t]he heart of the story was from the perspective of a pre-teen," he selected his pre-teen self as the narrator, "changed some names, and ... invented dialogue." Aside from these changes, however, Nayeri thinks of the book as a memoir.

Although he began writing the book in his twenties, Nayeri says he had been contemplating it since he was ten years old because, as an immigrant from Iran to Oklahoma, he often found himself explaining himself.

In terms of Everything Sad Is Untrue's guiding principle, Nayeri noted, "The book is immediately asking the reader not to lie to themselves. Not to dare believe they are any better. Not to omit themselves from the guilt. And from there it sets out to convince the reader that strictly speaking, all our memories are lies we tell ourselves."

Reception 
Everything Sad is Untrue was generally well-received, including starred reviews from Booklist, The Bulletin of the Center for Children's Books, Kirkus Reviews, Publishers Weekly, and School Library Journal.

In various reviews, the book was called "[m]esmerizing and hard-hitting," "a modern epic," "impressive,"

Booklist's Ronny Khuri noted, "Nayeri challenges outright what young readers can handle, in form and content, but who can deny him when it's his own experience on display? He demands much of readers, but in return he gives them everything," and ultimately called the book "[a] remarkable work that raises the literary bar in children's lit."

BookPage, The Bulletin of the Center for Children's Books, The New York Times, NPR, Publishers Weekly, Today, and The Wall Street Journal named Everything Sad is Untrue one of the best books of the year.

References 

Arthur A. Levine Books books
2020 children's books
Autobiographical novels
Michael L. Printz Award-winning works